Ribot may refer to:

People
Ribot (surname), list of people with the surname

Other uses
 Ribot (horse) (1952-1972), racehorse in Europe in the 1950s
 Ribot's law, law in retrograde amnesia 
 Cal Ribot, house located in Andorra
 Lait Ribot, fermented milk drink, similar to buttermilk, from Brittany, France
 Lycée Alexandre Ribot, school in France